The Port of Yangjiang is a natural estuary port on the coast of the city of Yangjiang, Guangdong Province, People's Republic of China. In 2013 it had a total cargo throughput of 21 million tonnes, an increase of 30%, mostly handling ore and coal.

The Port has 1 major port area and 6 port operation areas. 15 berths.

The list of Berths include: Yangjiang Coal Terminal; Lianggang Terminal; Yangjiang Ore Terminal; Yangxi Power Station.

References

External links
 Port of Yangjiang website

 

Ports and harbours of China